"Imagine" is a song performed by Norwegian singer Tone Damli as a duet with Eric Saade. The song is from her fifth studio album Looking Back (2012). It was written per request by and features vocals from Swedish singer Eric Saade. It was released in Norway as a digital download on 27 April 2012.

Music video
A music video to accompany the release of "Imagine" was first released onto YouTube on 26 June 2012 at a total length of three minutes and fifty-nine seconds. It features a love story between Damli and Saade, where she is set to marry someone, but only has eyes for Saade.  The video was shot in Ibiza.

Live performances
Damli and Saade have performed the song on Norwegian television on several occasions, once at the Norwegian television show "Allsang på Grensen" and once on "God Morgen Norge". They also performed the song on two live concerts as a part of the VG Lista 2012 tour, in Oslo and Stavanger.

Track listing

Chart performance

Release history

References

2012 singles
2011 songs
Tone Damli songs
Male–female vocal duets
Songs written by Jason Gill (musician)
Songs written by Eric Saade